Helleland is a village and parish in Eigersund municipality in Rogaland county, Norway. The Sørlandet Line runs along the river near Helleland, stopping at Helleland Station.

Historically, the Helleland clerical district included all the churches in the Helleland parish, Bjerkreim parish (with a chapel in Øvrebygd), and Heskestad parish.  The main church for the district was Helleland Church.  The Helleland parish was created as the municipality of Helleland under the formannskapsdistrikt law on 1 January 1838. That municipality existed until 1965.  Since then, the parish of Helleland has just included the "rural" northern part of Eigersund municipality.

Helleland Church (Helleland kirke) dates from 1832. It was built of wood and has 500 seats. The architect was Hans Linstow (1787–1851) who also designed the Royal Palace in Oslo and much of the surrounding park and the street Karl Johans gate.

At Helleland there are  memorials dedicated to the British aircraft which crashed during the occupation of Norway by Nazi Germany in connection with the Operation Freshman sabotage attempt, a part of action which was aimed at the Vemork hydroelectric plant, site of the heavy water production.

References

Eigersund
Villages in Rogaland